Josemania singularis, synonym Cipuropsis singularis, is a species of flowering plant in the family Bromeliaceae. This species is native to Costa Rica and Panama.

References

Tillandsioideae
Flora of Costa Rica
Flora of Panama